Ceratoclasis delimitalis is a moth in the family Crambidae. It was described by Achille Guenée in 1854. It is found in the West Indies (including Cuba, Hispaniola and Puerto Rico) and Brazil.

References

Moths described in 1854
Spilomelinae